"Amazing" is a song recorded by English singer-songwriter Foxes for her second studio album, All I Need.

"Amazing" was released as the album's third single on 4 December 2015.

Critical reception
Tayla Dickinson of Kube Radio said about the track, "True to its word, 'Amazing' is very self-descriptive and carries an almost quintessential upbeat, mood lifting vibe that any great song you can never grow tired of needs."

Music video
The official music video was directed by Johny Mourgue, and released via Foxes' VEVO and YouTube account on 17 December 2015.

Commencing the video, is an asleep Louisa Allen (Foxes), who is then woken up by her two friends. Subsequently, Foxes begins packing a suitcase, while also cutting her own hair. The trio of girls then embark on a fun road trip in their classic Volkswagen van, using a paper map to help guide them along the way. With an old camcorder, some of their experiences are recorded, such as: playing with a blue teddy bear, smashing cake, and eating ice-cream voraciously. They also played at a video game arcade, but that event was not recorded with a camcorder. The trio arrive at a dingy bar, where they sing karaoke, and get wasted with others. This leads to the culmination of the video, where the viewer observes the now dizzy and drunk trio making their way back to their van.

Track listing

Charts

References

External links

2015 singles
Foxes (singer) songs
2015 songs
Songs written by Jonny Lattimer
Songs written by Martin Brammer
Songs written by Foxes (singer)
Songs written by James Newman (musician)
Song recordings produced by Mark Ralph (record producer)